Makanrushi  (Japanese 磨勘留島; Makanru-tō) is an uninhabited volcanic island located near the northern end of the Kuril Islands chain in the Sea of Okhotsk in the northwest Pacific Ocean. Its name is derived from the Ainu language.

Geology
Makanrushi is roughly rectangular, with an area of 

The island has steep cliff sides and no sandy beaches, making landing very difficult and dangerous even in calm weather.
Makanrushi is 28 km away from Onekotan.  Makanrushi thus lies behind the main currently-active arc of Kuril Island volcanoes.

History
Makanrushi appears to have never been inhabited. It appears on an official map showing the territories of Matsumae Domain, a feudal domain of Edo period Japan dated 1644, and these holdings were officially confirmed by the Tokugawa shogunate in 1715.  Subsequently, claimed by the Empire of Russia, sovereignty initially passed to Russia under the terms of the Treaty of Shimoda, but was returned to the Empire of Japan per the Treaty of Saint Petersburg (1875) along with the rest of the Kuril islands. The island was formerly administered as part of Shimushu District of Nemuro Subprefecture of Hokkaidō. After World War II, the island came under the control of the Soviet Union, and is now administered as part of the Sakhalin Oblast of the Russian Federation.

On 10 August 1856, the ship Alexander Coffin (381 tons), Capt. Isaiah Purrington, of New Bedford, ran aground the island during a fog. The ship was lighted and sailed jury-rigged to Ayan, where she was condemned and sold at auction for $300.

See also
List of volcanoes in Russia

Notes

References

Further reading 

 Gorshkov, G. S. Volcanism and the Upper Mantle Investigations in the Kurile Island Arc. Monographs in geoscience. New York: Plenum Press, 1970. 
 Krasheninnikov, Stepan Petrovich, and James Greive. The History of Kamtschatka and the Kurilski Islands, with the Countries Adjacent. Chicago: Quadrangle Books, 1963. 
 Rees, David. The Soviet Seizure of the Kuriles. New York: Praeger, 1985.  
 Takahashi, Hideki, and Masahiro Ōhara. Biodiversity and Biogeography of the Kuril Islands and Sakhalin. Bulletin of the Hokkaido University Museum, no. 2-. Sapporo, Japan: Hokkaido University Museum, 2004.

External links

 Index Mundi: Makanrushi

Active volcanoes
Islands of the Sea of Okhotsk
Islands of the Russian Far East
Stratovolcanoes of Russia
Islands of the Kuril Islands
Uninhabited islands of Russia
Uninhabited islands of the Pacific Ocean
Volcanoes of the Kuril Islands
Mountains of the Kuril Islands
Shipwrecks in the Sea of Okhotsk